Zinc is a metallic chemical element.

Zinc may also refer to:

Science and technology
 Zinc (roof), a type of corrugated sheet metal roof
 Zinc Application Framework, a development platform for GUI programs
 ZINC database, a resource for computational drug discovery

Arts and entertainment
 Zinc (band), an Australian three piece pop rock band from 2002 to 2007
 DJ Zinc, British DJ, born as Benjamin Pettit (1972)

Radio stations
 Zinc 96, an Australian FM radio station
 Zinc 100.7, an Australian FM radio station
 Zinc 102.7, an Australian FM radio station

Other uses
 Zinc (horse), a British Thoroughbred racehorse (1820–1840)
 Zinc, Arkansas, a town in the US
 Lazarus Group, a cybercrime group, also known as Zinc